Nonclassical is a British independent record label and night club founded in 2004 by Gabriel Prokofiev, grandson of Sergei Prokofiev.

History
Nonclassical has released fourteen albums, each following a concept of recording new contemporary classical music and then inviting a selection of musicians and producers from various genres to remix it. Artists such as Thom Yorke (Radiohead), Hot Chip, Vex'd, Max de Wardener, Simon Tong (Gorillaz and The Verve), KREEPA, Dominic Murcott, John Maclean (The Beta Band & The Aliens), Mira Calix, DJ Spooky, Tim Exile, and Gabriel Prokofiev have done remixes for the label.

Nonclassical club nights 
Nonclassical hosts regular live music nights to promote a new alternative classical music scene in London. The nights have been held at a number of East London venues, including Bloc (Hackney Wick), The Shacklewell Arms, Red Gallery, Cargo, the Horse and Groom, The Macbeth, XOYO, and Kings Place.

The events present live contemporary classical music in 'gig' or 'club' settings, alongside DJs playing a mixture of modern composition, electronic dance music. Representative artists featured in DJ sets include Tansy Davies, Raymond Scott, Errorsmith, Stockhausen, Alarm Will Sound, Edgard Varèse.

In 2012, Nonclassical began hosting larger scale events at London's XOYO nightclub. These have featured high profile DJs and producers such as Juan Atkins, Nathan Fake, Optimo and Alex Smoke, and large live ensembles including a 52-piece string orchestra.

In 2020 James McIlwrath won the Nonclassical ‘Battle of the Bands’ competition with performances of Alison Knowles’ ‘Shuffle piece’, Neil Luck’s ‘THING’, and Oogoo Maia’s ‘Sisyphus at Work’.

Releases

References

External links
Nonclassical.co.uk
Nonclassical on Facebook

Contemporary classical music
Record labels established in 2004
British independent record labels